Anatoli Todorov (born 24 April 1985) is a Bulgarian retired football player who played as an offensive midfielder.

Career
His first club was Septemvri Sofia. Aged 17, he signed with Litex Lovech for a fee of 200 000. After being released from Rodopa Smolyan in January 2008, Todorov signed a 3-year deal with Lokomotiv Plovdiv. He has been given the №17 shirt. Anatoli made his official debut for Lokomotiv in a match against Lokomotiv Sofia on 1 March 2008. The result of which was a 1-2 defeat for Loko Plovdiv. In August 2009 Todorov became part of Lokomotiv Mezdra's squad.

On 19 July 2017, Todorov joined Spartak Pleven.

Video Game
He played as a striker in Championship Manager: Season 03/04. He was one of the best strikers in that version of game and even ever and was called the "goal machine" by many.

References

External links 
 
 
 

1985 births
Living people
Footballers from Sofia
Bulgarian footballers
First Professional Football League (Bulgaria) players
Second Professional Football League (Bulgaria) players
PFC Litex Lovech players
PFC Vidima-Rakovski Sevlievo players
PFC Rodopa Smolyan players
PFC Lokomotiv Plovdiv players
PFC Lokomotiv Mezdra players
FC Vitosha Bistritsa players
FC Septemvri Sofia players
FC Botev Vratsa players
FC Oborishte players
PFC Spartak Pleven players
Association football midfielders